The Performing Arts Workers' Equity (PAWE) was a small trade union in South Africa. It had a membership of only 365, but was affiliated to the Congress of South African Trade Unions. It merged with the Musicians Union of South Africa (MUSA) to form the Creative Workers Union of South Africa (CWUSA).

References

External links
 PAWE at the COSATU.
 Information on PAWE at UNESCO

Defunct trade unions in South Africa
Entertainment industry unions
Trade unions based in Johannesburg